The light novel series Chibi Vampire: The Novel is based on the Chibi Vampire manga series written by Yuna Kagesaki. Written by Tohru Kai with illustrations provided by Kagesaki, the novels follow the adventures of Karin, a vampire who gives blood instead of taking it, and Kenta, a classmate who learns her secret and becomes her daytime help, as they get tangled up in various mysteries.  The novels are published by Fujimi Shobo, with the first volume released on December 10, 2003, and the final in April 2008.

Tokyopop, which also licensed the manga series, acquired the license to release the novels in English in North America.  As the company had renamed the manga series from Karin to Chibi Vampire, it released the novel series under the name Chibi Vampire: The Novel. The first English volume was released on January 9, 2007. In June 2008, Tokyopop restructured itself, breaking into two subsidiaries under a single holding company, and cut its publication releases by more than half. As part of this cut back, Tokyopop canceled the remaining releases of Chibi Vampire: The Novel after the fifth volume, due to be released July 8, 2008. The company later reversed the cancellation and announced that volume six would be released April 13, 2010.

Chibi Vampire: The Novel is closely tied to the manga series, with each novel volume designed to be read after its corresponding manga volume. For example, the first novel takes place between the events that occur in the first and second volumes of the manga series, and the fourth volume of the manga mentions characters and events from the first novel volume.


Volume list

Chibi Vampire: The Novel

Shyness Diary

References

Chibi Vampire